Geranium is a town and locality in the Murray Mallee region of South Australia near the Mallee Highway. At the 2006 census, Geranium had a population of 240. It was surveyed in 1910 as the town supporting a station on the Pinnaroo railway line. The name is derived from a native plant prolific in the area.

References

Murray Mallee
Towns in South Australia